As Tall as Lions is the second full-length album from As Tall as Lions.  It was released on August 8, 2006, on Triple Crown Records.

Recording and production
The album took seven months to write and two months to record. It was produced by Mike Watts and Steve Haigler, and was released on CD and Limited Edition Vinyl.

Critical reception
The album received generally positive reviews. AbsolutePunk.net gave it a rating of nine out of ten, comparing them to (amongst others) Damien Rice, U2 and The Mars Volta. PopMatters was equally enthusiastic, giving it 8 out of 10 and calling it "skillful, beautiful, and musically significant". Alternative Press Magazine, known for reviewing mostly rock and indie bands, gave the album five of five stars and listed the band amongst their 2008's Most Anticipated Bands due to this "self-titled masterpiece."

Track listing
Stab City - 3:36
Song For Luna - 3:45
A Break A Pause - 3:40
Love, Love, Love (Love, Love) - 4:33
Ghost Of York - 4:07
Milk And Honey - 4:34
Be Here Now - 3:58
I'm Kicking Myself - 3:04
Where Do I Stand? - 3:39
Maybe I'm Just Tired - 10:30
The song "Maybe I'm Just Tired" ends at 4:30. After 2 minutes of silence (4:30 - 6:30), begins the hidden song "A Soft Hum".

References

2006 albums
As Tall as Lions albums
Triple Crown Records albums